Olga Kurkulina (born 1971) is a Soviet-born Israeli high-jumper, bodybuilder and actress.

In the 2013 movie Kick-Ass 2, she played Mother Russia, a villain. 
Kurkulina stars in the film Silent Times, and "The CruciFire" Directed by Christopher Annino

Personal life
Kurkulina was born and raised in the USSR. Later in her life she immigrated to Israel. 

Kurkulina is married and has two children, daughter Anna and son Danila. They reside in Haifa, Israel.

Partial filmography
Kick-Ass 2 (2013) - Mother Russia
Silent Times (2018) - The Mime
 Call for Dreams (2019) - Olga

Tidbits
Olga's acting career and media exposure both began to grow after her appearance as Mother Russia in 
Kick-Ass 2, including an early 2017 full feature in Beautivation Magazine by Amelia Wysocki.

References

External links

1971 births
Living people
Israeli film actresses
Israeli female high jumpers
Israeli female bodybuilders